Port Weller, Ontario is a community in St. Catharines, Regional Municipality of Niagara, Ontario, Canada and is part of the Golden Horseshoe region.

Port Weller is bounded by Lake Ontario (North Boundary), Read Road (East), Linwell Road (South) and Walkers Creek (West Boundary).  Port Weller East & West are divided by the Welland Canal. Port Weller West has a significantly higher population than Port Weller East because of industrial and agricultural development on the east side, such as the Welland Canal, Port Weller Dry Docks and local farms.

History

Port Weller, Ontario was named after John Laing Weller, an engineer on the first Welland Canal. John Laing Weller, a graduate of the Royal Military College of Canada, is listed on the Wall of Honour in Kingston, Ontario.

Features 
Port Weller contains vast green/play-space, including 11 parks, half with creeks or streams; 3 tennis & 4 basketball courts; 4 baseball & 6 soccer fields; 6+ playgrounds, 2 elementary schools, and 3 churches.

A unique attraction in Port Weller East is the 9/11 Memorial Park located on the Lake Ontario shoreline just north of Happy Rolphs Bird Sanctuary.  The 9/11 Memorial Park is home to a variety of trees, each planted to commemorate a Canadian lost in the North and South Towers of the World Trade Center.  To access the Memorial Park, take Lakeshore Road to Read Road and follow Read Road north to the lake.

The first official child born in Port Weller, was Frederick Shapero on November 18, 1914.  Son of European immigrants, he eventually became founder of Active Customs Brokers Ltd., established in 1953.

References

External links
 Aviador.es Metro Mobile Port Weller Marine Aerodrome (CWWZ)

Neighbourhoods in St. Catharines